Norman Howard Hogg (1 June 1883 – 9 October 1945) was a former Australian rules footballer who played with Carlton in the Victorian Football League (VFL).

Notes

External links 

Norm Hogg's profile at Blueseum

1883 births
1945 deaths
Australian rules footballers from Victoria (Australia)
Carlton Football Club players